The Society for Political Change (SCP) was a social-liberal political party in Latvia founded on 6 September 2008. Its members include two former ministers, former foreign minister Artis Pabriks and former economics minister Aigars Štokenbergs; its first president was economist Gatis Kokins.

The SCP ran as part of the Unity rainbow party alliance in the 2010 parliamentary election to the Saeima.  The party won six seats, out of the list's total of 33.  After the election, the SCP demanded that the right-wing National Alliance, which includes previous coalition partners For Fatherland and Freedom/LNNK, be excluded from the new government, which included Unity and the Union of Greens and Farmers.

On 6 August 2011, it merged with two other parties to form the new political party Unity.

Footnotes

External links
Party website

Defunct political parties in Latvia
Liberal parties in Latvia
Defunct liberal political parties
Political parties established in 2008
Political parties disestablished in 2011
2008 establishments in Latvia
2011 disestablishments in Latvia